is a Japanese former football player who last played for Sagan Tosu.

Career
Taniguchi retired from football at the end of the 2019 season.

National team career
In August 2008, Taniguchi was selected Japan U-23 national team for 2008 Summer Olympics. At this tournament, he played all 3 matches as offensive midfielder.

Club statistics
Updated to 24 February 2020.

National team career statistics

Appearances in major competitions

Honours
Kawasaki Frontale
 J2 League: 2004

Kashiwa Reysol
 J.League Cup: 2013Individual'''
 J.League Best XI: 2006
 J.League Cup New Hero Award: 2006

References

External links

Profile at Sagan Tosu

1985 births
Living people
Association football people from Kanagawa Prefecture
Japanese footballers
J1 League players
J2 League players
Kawasaki Frontale players
Yokohama F. Marinos players
Kashiwa Reysol players
Sagan Tosu players
Olympic footballers of Japan
Footballers at the 2008 Summer Olympics
Footballers at the 2006 Asian Games
Asian Games competitors for Japan
Association football midfielders